This is a list of the National Register of Historic Places listings in Anderson County, Texas.

This is intended to be a complete list of properties and districts listed on the National Register of Historic Places in Anderson County, Texas. There are five districts and 23 individual properties listed on the National Register in the county. Eight individually listed properties are designated Recorded Texas Historic Landmarks while more are contained within two districts.

Current listings

The publicly disclosed locations of National Register properties and districts may be seen in a mapping service provided.

|}

See also

National Register of Historic Places listings in Texas
Recorded Texas Historic Landmarks in Anderson County

References

External links

Registered Historic Places
Anderson County
Buildings and structures in Anderson County, Texas